European Air Transport N.V./S.A. (EAT)  was a cargo airline headquartered in Brussels Airport (Building 4-5) and in Zaventem, Belgium. The airline was owned by Deutsche Post and operated the group's DHL-branded parcel and express services in Europe.

History

European Air Transport was founded in Belgium in 1971 as an air taxi service. EAT was created by two pilots, Pirlot de Corbion and Dessain. EAT started with two aircraft, a Beechcraft Queen Air and a Gardan Horizon. In response to the need for pilots in the Belgian market, EAT began a pilot training school. In 1973, EAT was the first Piper Flying Centre in Europe.

EAT expanded its activities by contracting with DHL Worldwide Express in 1985.  Previously, DHL had selected Brussels Airport as its European hub. The co-operation between EAT and DHL was so successful that in 1986, DHL decided to make EAT part of the DHL group, and thus became the major DHL airline with service to Europe and Africa. On January 19, 1993, EAT became a member of the International Air Transport Association. In that same year, EAT obtained the necessary permits to transport various dangerous goods and live animals.

In 2002, Deutsche Post completed the takeover of DHL, making EAT a wholly owned subsidiary.

In October 2004, Deutsche Post announced that Brussels Airport would no longer be DHL's major hub for Europe starting in 2008. This was due to the failure of the Belgian Federal Government and Deutsche Post to reach an agreement on a framework to permit DHL to expand its future flight operations. As a consequence, Deutsche Post decided to make Leipzig/Halle Airport in Germany its international hub, with daily flights to all major cities in Europe. EAT's headquarters were located in Schkeuditz. EAT has a license for scheduled and unscheduled cargo flights all over the world.

Through a merger agreement dated February 10, 2010, European Air Transport N.V. was dissolved, and its assets incorporated by the European Air Transport Leipzig GmbH. They merged in March 26, 2010.

Fleet

European Air Transport had formerly operated the following aircraft:

Accidents and incidents

On November 22, 2003, an Airbus A300B4-200F (registered as OO-DLL) was struck on the left wing tip by a surface-to-air missile shortly after takeoff from Baghdad, Iraq. The damage resulted in a fire and complete loss of hydraulic flight control systems. The crew returned to Baghdad, there were no injuries.

See also
List of defunct airlines of Belgium

References

6."2003 Baghdad DHL attempted shootdown incident", Wikipedia, 2021-03-21, retrieved 2021-04-08

http://www.cmb.be/business-structure.html#ASL Aviation

External links

DHL

Defunct airlines of Belgium
Airlines established in 1971
Airlines disestablished in 2010
Defunct cargo airlines
DHL
Belgian companies established in 1971
Zaventem
Cargo airlines of Belgium
Companies based in Flemish Brabant
2010 disestablishments in Belgium